MRV is the biggest Brazilian homebuilder and real estate company. The company was founded in 1979 by Mário Lúcio Pinheiro Menin, Rubens Menin Teixeira de Souza and Vega Engenharia Ltda and is headquartered in Belo Horizonte. The company's major shareholder is Brazilian entrepreneur Rubens Menin Teixeira de Souza.

MRV is the biggest homebuilder company in Brazil by revenue.

References 

Companies based in Minas Gerais
Companies listed on B3 (stock exchange)
Real estate companies of Brazil
Construction and civil engineering companies of Brazil
Construction and civil engineering companies established in 1979
Real estate companies established in 1997
Brazilian companies established in 1979